Romi Ghimire ( Romi Wani Ghimire ) is a Nepali actress and a model. She started her career as a media personal. For a couple of years, she hosted the cultural show named 'Hamro Nepal' produced by NTV PLUS. Later on, she joined Image Channel to host 'Pratibha Dabu' a dance reality show. Then, she appeared in some popular Nepali TV serials; Thorai Vaye Pugisari, Harke Hawaldar and Kilo Tango Mike. She was awarded with best co-actress in FAAN National Award for her visually impaired role in her debut movie Classic.

References

Nepalese female models
21st-century Nepalese actresses
Living people
Year of birth missing (living people)
Khas people